No Men Allowed (romanized: Vorud-e-Aghayan Mamnu') is a 2011 Iranian comedy film directed by Rambod Javan and written by Peyman Ghasemkhani. The film screened for the first time at the 29th Fajr Film Festival and received an award and a nomination.

Premise 
The principal of a private girls' high school strongly opposes men entering her school. But when the chemistry teacher of the Olympiad students takes six months off due to childbirth, she is forced to bring a substitute teacher to the high school; But her efforts to find a female Olympiad teacher in the middle of the school year are in vain, and she has to accept a man as the only option.

Cast 

 Vishka Asayesh as Bita Darabi
 Reza Attaran as Vahid Jebeli
 Mani Haghighi as Faramarz Shapouri
 Pegah Ahangarani as Parya Shapouri
 Setareh Pesyani as Reyhaneh
 Bahareh Rahnama as Yasaman Aghasi
 Ali Sadeghi as Driver
 Falamak Joneidi asa Shahla Nazerzadeh
 Hadis Miramini as Zhina
 Mehrnaz Bayat as Mahshid
 Parinaz Izadyar as Sahar
 Zohreh Hamidi as Mrs. Yazdanpanah
 Siavash Cheraghi Pour as Mr. Rezaeian
 Katayun Amir Ebrahimi as Jebeli's Mother
 Behrang Tofighi as Driver

Reception

Accolades

References 
High school films
Iranian comedy films
2010s Persian-language films

External links